Adam van Dommele (born 5 September 1984 in Elizabeth, South Australia, Australia) is an Australian footballer who last played for MetroStars.

Club career
In 2005 after returning from England he signed with A-League club Adelaide United however was released after his second season. Since then he has played for South Melbourne FC and most recently MetroStars, who serves currently as Captain.

International career
He has represented Australia at Under 17 level, including during the 2001 FIFA U-17 World Championship held in Trinidad and Tobago where he played in every game.

References

1984 births
Living people
People from Adelaide
Australian people of Dutch descent
Association football fullbacks
A-League Men players
FFSA Super League players
Australian soccer players
Modbury Jets SC players
Enfield City FC players
Adelaide United FC players
South Melbourne FC players
North Eastern MetroStars SC players
Adelaide Raiders SC players
National Premier Leagues players
South Australian Sports Institute soccer players